The Top Four Cup was an association football super cup featuring the top four clubs in the League of Ireland. It was first held in 1955–56 and last played for in 1973–74. It was played at the end of the season. Shamrock Rovers were the inaugural winners and subsequently featured in seven finals. Waterford won the competition the most times, five times in total. The competition was sponsored by the Irish Independent and a result was also known as the Independent Cup. The cup was last won by Cork Celtic and is currently on display in the Evergreen Bar in Turners Cross, Cork. During the late 1960s the (Northern) Irish Football League also organised a Top Four Cup. Between 1998 and 2001 the FAI organised a similar formatted competition known as the FAI Super Cup.

List of finals

Notes

See also
 FAI Super Cup
 LFA President's Cup 
 President of Ireland's Cup
 Top Four Cup (Northern Ireland)

References

League of Ireland
Defunct association football cup competitions in the Republic of Ireland
Ireland
1956 establishments in Ireland
1973 disestablishments in Ireland